The 2016 Music City Bowl was an American college football bowl game played on December 30, 2016 at Nissan Stadium in Nashville, Tennessee. It featured the Nebraska Cornhuskers, from the Big Ten Conference, and the Tennessee Volunteers, from the Southeastern Conference (SEC). It was one of the 2016–17 bowl games of the 2016 NCAA Division I FBS football season. The game was sponsored by the Franklin American Mortgage Company and was officially known as the Franklin American Mortgage Music City Bowl. As of 2021 this was the last bowl berth by Nebraska.

Teams
The 2016 matchup was the third all-time meeting between these two teams, with Nebraska leading the series 2–0 going into the 2016 game. The first time these two teams met was in the 1998 Orange Bowl with Nebraska beating Tennessee with the score of 42–17. Nebraska went on to win a share of the national championship after the victory. The previous meeting of the two teams was in 2000 with Nebraska winning 31–21 in the Fiesta Bowl. The 2016 matchup was the first time the two teams met as members of the Big Ten and SEC; the previous meetings came when Nebraska was a member of the Big 12 Conference.

Nebraska

Tennessee

Game summary

Scoring summary

Statistics

Depth chart

Depth chart

References

2016–17 NCAA football bowl games
2016
2016 Music City Bowl
2016 Music City Bowl
December 2016 sports events in the United States
2016 in sports in Tennessee